Belle Meade is a city in Davidson County, Tennessee.

Belle Meade operates independently as a city, complete with its own regulations, a city hall, and police force, but it is also integrated with the Nashville government. Developed in part on the territory of the former Belle Meade plantations, residential areas are suburban with tree-lined streets and wooded areas. The median annual income of Belle Meade residents is $195,208, which exceeds the median annual income in the U.S. by more than three times.

The city's history dates back to 1807, when John Harding of Virginia purchased the Dunham's Station log cabin and 250 acres (100 ha) on the Natchez Trace near Richland Creek. He named the property Belle Meade, which is French for "beautiful meadow". Over the next few decades, enslaved African Americans built Harding's mansion, and established a thoroughbred breeding farm and cotton plantation. He conducted various service businesses on the property, including a grist and saw mill, a cotton gin, and a blacksmith shop – all primarily operated by enslaved African-Americans.

Harding's son, William Giles Harding, inherited the estate in 1839.  In 1866 his daughter Selene married brigadier general William Hicks Jackson, who controlled the land from 1883 and made the estate gain international recognition for its horses.  In 1906, debt forced the Harding family to sell Belle Meade. Belle Meade Land Company built the first road and in 1938 developed the neighborhood that established the City of Belle Meade. The mansion was converted into a museum. On December 30, 1969, it was listed on the National Register of Historic Places (#69000177).

History
The city of  takes its name from Belle Meade Plantation, which once encompassed . It was founded by planter John Harding and inherited at 1,200 acres by his son, William Giles Harding. Before the Civil War, the younger Harding more than doubled the property and built a new mansion, with the labor of the 136 enslaved African people.

His descendants founded the Belle Meade Country Club here in 1901.

Because of debt, the trustee of the Belle Meade Estate sold the mansion and 2,200 acres in May 1906 to Jacob McGavock Dickinson, the general counsel of the Illinois Central Railroad. He later served as the United States Secretary of War from 1909 to 1911.

In 1906 he co-founded the Belle Meade Land Company with J. M. Overton, Stuyvesant Fish, James Theodore Harahan, and J. C. Welling. They hired Ossian Cole Simonds to design the community. In 1910 Luke Lea, publisher of The Tennessean; Telfair Hodgson Jr. (the treasurer of Sewanee: The University of the South); and David Shepherd bought Belle Mead Company. They began the development of Belle Meade's main streets, including Jackson Boulevard and Belle Meade Boulevard. Meanwhile, Johnson Bransford built Deer Park, Berkley Hills, Reservoir Hill, and the Belle Meade Golf Links.

Belle Meade was absorbed into the metropolitan government of Nashville-Davidson County in 1963, but it retained its independent city status. Residents pay taxes both to the Metro government and to the City of Belle Meade. Belle Meade streets have distinct signage, and the city has its own police force, mayor, and city hall. Many houses in the city have been listed on the National Register of Historic Places since July 7, 2004.

The vast majority of the Belle Meade area is designated as ZIP code 37205. A few homes are in ZIP code 37215. Rusty Moore is the current mayor. His term expires in November 2022.

Geography
Belle Meade Boulevard ends at the main historic entrance to Percy Warner Park, the city's largest park, and Richland Creek flows through the neighborhood.

Demographics

2020 census

As of the 2020 United States census, there were 2,901 people, 853 households, and 748 families residing in the city.

2010 census
As of the 2010 Census, there were 2,912 people, 1,074 households, and 872 families residing in the city. The racial makeup of the city was 98.2% White, 0.2% African American, 0.1% Native American, 0.8% Asian, 0.2% from other races, and 0.6% from two or more races. Hispanic or Latino of any race accounted for 0.8% of the population. The population density was 944.2 people per square mile (364.6/km2). There were 1,162 housing units at an average density of 376.8 per square mile (145.5/km2).

There were 1,074 households, out of which 37.7% had children under the age of 18 living with them, 77.2% were married couples living together, 3.2% had a female householder with no husband present, 0.8% had a male householder with no wife present, and 18.8% were non-families. 17.3% of all households were made up of individuals, and 10.4% had someone living alone who was 65 years of age or older. The average household size was 2.71, and the average family size was 3.08.

In the city, the population was spread out, with 30.9% under the age of 20, 1.8% from 20 to 24, 13.4% from 25 to 44, 35.5% from 45 to 64, and 18.5% who were 65 years of age or older. The median age was 47.1 years. For every 100 females, there were 97.6 males. For every 100 females age 18 and over, there were 92.5 males.

According to 2012–2016 American Community Survey 5-Year Estimates conducted by the U.S. Census Bureau, the median income for a household in Belle Meade was $195,208, and the median income for a family was $228,472. Males had a median income of $209,063 versus $100,125 for females. The per capita income for the city was $129,928, which is the highest in the state and among the highest in the nation. About 4.4% of families and 4.3% of the population were living below the poverty line, including 1.3% of those under age 18 and 5.1% of those age 65 or over.

Economy 
According to the American Community Survey (ACS) 5-Year Estimate conducted by the U.S. Census Bureau in 2016, the economy of Belle Meade focuses mainly on three industries: Healthcare and Social Assistance (22%); Professional, Scientific, and Tech Services (17.6%); and Finance and Insurance (15.6%). Other sectors like Manufacturing (6.3%), Retail (5.1%), Education Services (7%), and Real Estate, Rental, and Leasing (6.9%) have smaller concentrations.

Based on the same report, the top three occupations in Belle Meade were Management (28.2%), Sales (16.7%), and Health Practitioners (13.3%). Notable occupations in smaller numbers included Legal (7.7%), Arts and Recreation (6.3%), Business and Financial (7.8%), and Education, Training, and Library (6.2%).

Arts and culture 
Built in the 1820s by John Harding, Belle Meade Plantation is a primary attraction for those interested in the history and culture of the area. The plantation is home to a number of historical buildings, including Dunham Station's cabin and a Victorian-style manor that houses a museum filled with artifacts that once belonged to the Harding family.

Cheekwood Estate and Gardens – now a 55-acre botanical garden and museum of art – is the former home of Leslie and Mabel Cheek. Located just outside the southwestern boundary of Belle Meade, the attraction hosts world-renowned art exhibits, festivals, and family events throughout the year.

Parks and recreation 
Belle Meade Country Club – This members-only club is home to an 18-hole, par 72, 6,885-yard golf course and various other amenities, including tennis courts and a pool. Use of the club requires membership – a lengthy and challenging process – or entering as a guest with a member. Originally designed by architect Donald J. Ross and later renovated by architects Rees Jones and Bryce Swanson, the course has Bermuda grass fairways and bent grass greens and was rated by Golf Digest as a top Tennessee course in 2005–2006.

Percy Warner Golf Course – This golf course is located in the northeastern corner of Percy Warner Park at the southwestern edge of Belle Meade. It is a 9-hole, par 34, 2,600-yard course with tree-lined fairways. The course uses a first-come, first-served, open play concept, and greens and rental cart fees are modest. Rental clubs and pull carts are also available, and private carts are allowed for a fee.

Percy Warner Park and Edwin Warner Park – They are technically two connecting parks, but Nashville locals often refer to Percy Warner Park and Edwin Warner Park simply as "The Warner Parks". The northern border of Percy Warner Park lies at the southwestern edge of Belle Meade. Combined, the parks include more than 3,100 acres. Amenities include picnic grounds and shelters, a nature center, hiking and biking trails, scenic overlooks, sports fields, horse trails, an equestrian center, and golf courses.

The parks also have historical significance and are listed in the National Register of Historic Places. Colonel Luke Lea and his second wife, Percie Warner, donated almost 900 acres of land – a large portion of which came from the former Belle Meade Plantation – to establish the park in 1927. Margaret Warner, the widow of Percy Warner, donated the funds to erect the sandstone gates and stone eagles that have marked the entrance of Percy Warner Park since 1932. The limestone staircase known as The Allee was designed by landscape architect Bryant Fleming and built in the mid-1930s to mark the entrance to Percy Warner Park at Belle Meade Boulevard.

Other historical sites in the park include 10 pre-Civil War cemeteries and a World War I memorial that honors Camp Andrew Jackson, a WWI army training site previously located at the site of Percy Warner Golf Course.

Parmer Park – Located on a section of land that used to be the home of Parmer School, which burned in the 1980s, this park consists of open green space, basketball courts, playground equipment, and a baseball field. The entrance of the former school still stands in the middle of the park.

Government 

The form of government for the City of Belle Meade is a city manager-commissioner structure. Policy is made and carried out by a board of commissioners, and the city manager serves as the chief administrative officer. Five commissioners are elected by the residents and serve four-year terms. Those commissioners then elect two members to serve as mayor and vice-mayor for shorter terms of two years.

The current mayor of Belle Meade is Rusty Moore, and the vice-mayor is Haley Dale.  The three other commissioners include:

 Louise Bryan – term ending November 2026
 James V. Hunt – term ending November 2024
 Neil Clayton – term ending November 2026

According to the annual audit report ending June 30, 2017, the City of Belle Meade had total annual revenues of $6,191,617 and total annual operating expenses of $3,918,521. The city's total net position as of June 30, 2017, was $20,412,803. The city's primary sources of revenue are property taxes and state sales and income taxes.

Belle Meade is part of State House District 56 for the Tennessee General Assembly.  The city is part of State Senate District 20, with Heidi Campbell (politician) as the current state senator for the district. At the national level, Belle Meade is in Congressional District 5 in Tennessee, and Andy Ogles is the current representative for the district.

Education
Belle Meade is part of the Metropolitan Nashville Public Schools District. No public schools are located inside the city's boundaries, but various public schools are located nearby, including Julia Green Elementary (grades K-4), H.G. Hill Middle School (grades 5–8), and Hillwood Comp High School (grades 9–12). Additionally, several private schools are located very near the perimeter, including Harding Academy, Harpeth Hall School, Montgomery Bell Academy, and The Ensworth School.

 Harding Academy is a PreK-8, coeducational private school founded in 1971 as a segregation academy. The  school's president, Harold Black, told a newspaper that "busing had influenced the thinking of a lot of parents." The school has long since adopted a policy of non-discrimination. Current enrollment is 493, with an average class size of 18 and an 8:1 student to teacher ratio. Approximately 68% of the teachers on staff have advanced degrees. 
 Harpeth Hall School is a private school for girls in grades 5–12. Founded in 1865, it has a current enrollment of 689, with an average class size of 14. Various extracurricular activities are available in addition to academics.
 Montgomery Bell Academy is a private school founded in 1867 for boys in grades 7–12. Current enrollment is 770 students, with a student to teacher ratio of 7.5:1 and an average class size of 13. Approximately 74% of the faculty has advanced degrees.
 The Ensworth School's Lower/Middle School campus is located just northeast of Belle Meade. It has a current enrollment of 423 in the lower school and 248 in the middle school, and approximately 67% of teachers have advanced degrees. The student to teacher ratio is 7:1 with an average class size of 15. Extracurricular activities include swimming, ice hockey, and lacrosse.

Several colleges and universities are located within a few miles of Belle Meade, including Vanderbilt University, Nashville State Community College, Tennessee College of Applied Technology, and Aquinas College.

Infrastructure 
Belle Meade has its own Public Works Department offering trash pickup; recycling service for paper, boxes, some plastics, and metal and aluminum cans; and brush and chipper services for lawn and landscaping debris. The city also maintains its own pressure sewer system.

The city maintains its own police department and offers various services to the community in addition to routine policing. Those services include a neighborhood watch program, fingerprinting, prescription drug collection, house check service when owners are out of town, and hiring of off-duty officers for special events.

Notable people
Belle Meade residents include former U.S. vice president and 2000 presidential candidate Al Gore; entertainers Vince Gill and Amy Grant; Pulitzer Prize winning author Jon Meacham; Chief Justice of the Tennessee Supreme Court Frank Drowota; co-founder and former CEO of Hospital Corporation of America Thomas F. Frist, Jr.; Frist's son, investor Thomas F. Frist, III; convicted cocaine smuggler Russell W. Brothers; fast food business executive C. Stephen Lynn; and chairman and CEO of Ingram Content Group John R. Ingram.

References

Further reading

External links

 City of Belle Meade official website

 
Cities in Tennessee
Cities in Davidson County, Tennessee
Cities in Nashville metropolitan area